Hoseynabad-e Baba Khanjar (also Romanized as Ḩoseynābād-e Bābā Khanjar; also known as Hasanābād, Hosein Abad Mehraban, Ḩoseynābād, and Husainābād) is a village in Shirin Su Rural District, Shirin Su District, Kabudarahang County, Hamadan Province, Iran. At the 2006 census, its population was 417, in 81 families.

References 

Populated places in Kabudarahang County